Mitella nuda, the naked bishop's cap or naked miterwort, is a plant in the genus Mitella.
It has a single leaf, serrate but not deeply lobed, rising in single stalks from the ground. The leaf color is light green. Tiny white hairs arise perpendicular to the leaf surface. These are especially large and noticeable on the leaf top, but occur on the bottom also. 
The naked bishop's cap provides low ground cover and grows to be 1/4 inch to 1½ inches tall, not counting inflorescence.

References

nuda
Flora of Canada
Flora of China
Flora of Japan
Flora of Korea
Flora of Russia
Flora of the Northern United States
Plants described in 1753
Taxa named by Carl Linnaeus